The men's 100 metres T35 took place in Stadium Australia.

There were no preliminary rounds; only a final round was held. The T35 is for athletes who have coordination impairments such as hypertonia, ataxia and athetosis.

Final round

References

Athletics at the 2000 Summer Paralympics